Standings and results for Group 5 of the UEFA Euro 1984 qualifying tournament.

Group 5 consisted of Cyprus, Czechoslovakia, reigning World Champions Italy, Romania and Sweden. Group winners were Romania, who finished a point clear of second-placed Sweden.

Final table

Results

Goalscorers

References
UEFA Page
RSSSF

Group 5
1982–83 in Italian football
1983–84 in Italian football
1982–83 in Czechoslovak football
1983–84 in Czechoslovak football
1982–83 in Cypriot football
1983–84 in Cypriot football
1982–83 in Romanian football
1983–84 in Romanian football
Romania at UEFA Euro 1984
1982 in Swedish football
1983 in Swedish football
1981–82 in Cypriot football
1981–82 in Romanian football